Syed Ata-ul-Mohsin Bukhari (سید عطاء المحسن بخاری) (also known as Mohsin E Ahrar, 21 January 1939 – 21 November 1999) was as a Pakistani leader of Majlis-e-Ahrar-e-Islam. He was the son of Syed Ata Ullah Shah Bukhari and a Muslim Hanafischolar, religious and political leader.

Early life
Bukhari was born in Amritsar on 21 January 1939.

Oratory and poetry
He was known for his intention. He was also a poet and most of his linguists were published in Monthly Naqeeb E Khatm E Nabuwat

Death
Syed Ata Ul Mohsin Bukhari died on 21 November 1999 in Multan. In the age of 63 years He was buried in Multan near his father's (Syed Ata Ullah Shah Bukhari) & Mother grave.

References

Deobandis
Hanafis
Persian-language poets
Pakistani religious leaders
Politicians from Patna
People from Amritsar
Presidents of Majlis-e-Ahrar-ul-Islam
Secretary Generals of Majlis-e-Ahrar-ul-Islam
1939 births
1999 deaths

ur:سید عطاء اللہ شاہ بخاری